Bourg-Murat is a village on the Plaine des Cafres on the French island of Réunion, lying north east of Le Tampon.  It has a museum dedicated to the nearby Piton de la Fournaise volcano and is home to the Piton de la Fournaise Volcano Observatory.

References

Populated places in Réunion